Kaydan (also Romanized as Kāydān and Kayedan; also known as Kāydūn, Koidūn, Koweydān, and Kowydān) is a village in Aghili-ye Jonubi Rural District, Aghili District, Gotvand County, Khuzestan Province, Iran. At the 2006 census, its population was 796, in 150 families.

References 

Populated places in Gotvand County